"We Won" is a song by D-Block Europe. It was released as a single in 2020 and peaked at number 31 on the UK Singles Chart.

Charts

References

2020 songs
D-Block Europe songs